A hardgainer is a person who practices bodybuilding but finds it challenging to develop musculature regardless of the amount of effort put in. The opposite of a hardgainer is an easygainer.

Difficulty building muscle is often associated with the ectomorph body somatotype, however other common reasons also include a lack of proper nutrition, suitable physical activity level or not allowing enough recovery time for the stressed muscles to regain their previous state and then grow bigger (overtraining).

For the true hardgainer, the issue lies deeper beneath any of the required elements of muscle gain listed above. Those are typically either diseases that affect muscles and/or protein synthesis, or there might be a genetic disorder that hinders protein synthesis and/or limits the maximum amount of muscles the body can hold to a relatively small amount for that person.

Muscular dystrophy is a group of inherited diseases that are characterized by weakness and wasting away of muscle tissue, with or without the breakdown of nerve tissue.

Some metabolic diseases affect the normal metabolic processes in the body:

Acid maltase deficiency
Carnitine deficiency
Carnitine palmitoyltransferase II deficiency
Debrancher Enzyme Deficiency
Lactate dehydrogenase deficiency
Mitochondrial myopathy
Myoadenylate deaminase deficiency
Glycogen storage disease type V
Phosphofructokinase deficiency
Phosphoglycerate kinase deficiency

The MSTN gene also plays a big role in muscle development. It provides instructions for making a protein called myostatin. This protein transforming growth factor beta (TGFβ) superfamily, which is a group of proteins that help control the growth and development of tissues throughout the body. This protein restrains muscle growth, preventing muscles from growing too large. Increased amount of myostatin portray deficiency in muscle development and increase of fat; on the other hand, smaller than normal amounts of myostatin greatly increase natural muscle mass, strength and decrease fat levels. There are no known health problems related to the myostatin mutations, and affected individuals are intellectually normal.

References

Bodybuilding